Dmitriyevka is a rural locality (a village) and the administrative centre of Dmitriyevsky Selsoviet, Blagovarsky District, Bashkortostan, Russia. The population was 362 as of 2010. There are 6 streets.

Geography 
Dmitriyevka is located 48 km west of Yazykovo (the district's administrative centre) by road. Sharbash is the nearest rural locality.

References 

Rural localities in Blagovarsky District